Brasil Nordeste is the eleventh solo album by Brazilian musician Zé Ramalho. It was released in 1991, after a four-year gap with no albums.

Track listing 
 Baião / Imbalança / Asa branca - 3:42
 Carcará / Pisa na fulô / O canto da ema - 3:11 
 Sebastiana / Um a um / Chiclete com banana - 2:57
 No pé de serra / O xote das meninas / Qui nem giló - 3:10
 Gemedeira / Frevo mulher - 2:49
 Vendedor de caranguejo / Súplica cearense - 3:10
 Boiadeiro / Paraíba - 2:21 
 Disparada / Fica mal com Deus - 4:10
 Sangue e pudins / Eternas ondas - 3:15
 Avôhai / Admirável gado novo / Galope razante - 3:50 
 Mucuripe / Paralelas - 4:45
 Último pau de arara / Meu cariri - 3:07

Personnel 
 Zé Ramalho - Acoustic guitar
 Joca Costa  - Arrangement, electric guitar
 Chico Guedes - Bass guitar
 Gustavo Schröeter - Drums
 Genário - Accordion
 Zé Leal - Percussion
 Zé Gomes - Percussion
 Ricardo Rente - Saxophone, flute

References

1991 albums
Zé Ramalho albums
Columbia Records albums